The Alter Boys is an American rock supergroup from Cleveland, Ohio. The band includes members of the bands Dog Fashion Disco, Polkadot Cadaver, Unified Culture, Mudfoot, Original Pranksta, Venomin James, and Mushroomhead. Also featured in the band was Ryan Dunn of the stunt show Jackass. They play in various musical styles and released their first album, The Exotic Sounds of the Alter Boys, in March 2005. They were signed to the Fractured Transmitter record label. However, in late February 2009, they were removed from the Fractured Transmitter site. Rotten Records re-released The Exotic Sounds of the Alter Boys in January 2009. Though they never broke up, Todd Smith has since stated that The Alter Boys are "dead".

Members
Jason Popson - vocals
Todd Smith - guitar, vocals
Mike Martini - guitar, accordion, vocals
Matt Rippetoe - keyboards, woodwind
Jeff Siegel - keyboards
Craig Martini - bass, vocals
Eric Matthews - drums

Former
Ryan Dunn - additional vocals

Discography

Albums

References

External links
The Alter Boys — Fractured Transmitter recording company site
The Alter Boys on Facebook — Facebook

American experimental musical groups
Funk rock musical groups
Musical groups established in 2004
Musical groups from Cleveland